Central Party School or Central Party Affairs School could refer to:
Central Party Affairs School (now National Chengchi University), former central party school of Nationalist government established on July 20, 1927
Central Party School of the Communist Party of China established on July 22, 1927